Newton Whiting Gilbert (May 24, 1862 – July 5, 1939) was an American politician from Indiana.

Career
He was the 25th lieutenant governor of Indiana, a member of the Indiana State Senate, a representative in the United States House of Representatives, and an acting governor-general of the Philippines from September 1, 1913 to October 6, 1913. He served on the Philippine Commission, the appointed upper house of the Philippine Legislature of the American colonial Insular Government of the Philippines.

References

External links

1862 births
1939 deaths
People from Worthington, Ohio
Republican Party members of the United States House of Representatives from Indiana
Governors-General of the Philippine Islands
Lieutenant Governors of Indiana
Republican Party Indiana state senators